Juan Cárdenas (born 1939) is a Colombian figurative painter. He was born in Popayán. He graduated from Columbia University in New York, and in 1962 he studied painting at the Rhode Island School of Design, Providence, Rhode Island, in the United States.

His career began as a cartoonist in El Tiempo, La República, El Espacio, and in the magazine Flash. He was jailed for a cartoon. From 1969 to 1972 he was professor of Painting, Drawing, and Anatomy, University of the Andes, Colombia. He participated in and won first prize in the 25th National Salon of Colombian Artists in 1974 for his self-portrait ("Autorretrato Dibujo").

Notes

References
Great Encyclopedia of Colombia, Circulo de Lectores, Bogotá
Art of Colombia, Salvat, Bogotá

Colombian painters
Colombian male painters
1939 births
Living people

Columbia University alumni
Rhode Island School of Design alumni